Christy may refer to:

 Christy (given name)
 Christy (surname)
 Christy (novel), by Catherine Marshall
 Christy (towel manufacturer), a UK textile firm established in 1850
 Christy (TV series)
 Christy: Return to Cutter Gap, a TV movie based on the TV series
 Christy Award, given annually for the best Christian novels
 Christy Township, Lawrence County, Illinois, United States
 129564 Christy, an asteroid
 Christy (2023 film)

See also 
 Christie (disambiguation)